The 25th Golden Disc Awards were held December 9, 2010. They recognized accomplishments by musicians from the previous year.

Presenters 
 Joo Sang-wook
 Lee Tae-im
 Lee Young-ah
 Yoon Shi-yoon
 Song Chang-eui
 Seo Ji-hye
 Min Hyo-rin
 Lee Si-young
 Lee Chae-young
 Park Min-young
 Nam Gyu-ri
 Lee Yeon-hee
 Yoo Ah-in

Winners and nominees

Main awards 
Winners and nominees are listed in alphabetical order. Winners are listed first and emphasized in bold.

Other awards 

 Lifetime Achievement Award: Park Choon-seok (composer)
 Record Producer of the Year: Hong Seung-sung (Cube Entertainment)

Gallery

References

External links 
 Official website

25
2010 music awards
2010 in South Korean music
December 2010 events in South Korea